The Electricity Corporation of New Zealand Ltd (ECNZ) is a New Zealand state-owned enterprise (SOE) formed on 1 April 1987, as a transition entity in the process of deregulating the New Zealand electricity market. Most of ECNZ's remaining liabilities were resolved in the late 2000s, and ECNZ is  a residual entity with the sole remaining task of winding up a series of land title issues.

Formation
In the 1980s the New Zealand Electricity Department (NZED), a government department, controlled and operated almost all New Zealand electricity generation and operated the electricity transmission grid. The first phase of deregulation saw the New Zealand Government corporatise the NZED and form the state-owned enterprise ECNZ.

Division 
In 1994, Transpower was separated from ECNZ and created as an SOE to own and operate the national grid. In 1996, ECNZ was split into two SOEs, ECNZ and Contact Energy, and on 1 April 1999 ECNZ was split into three electricity generation SOEs:
 Genesis Energy, 
 Meridian Energy, and
 Mighty River Power (now Mercury Energy).

All three remain in existence, along with Contact Energy and Transpower.

ECNZ was originally proposed to be wound up by 2009, but resolving the few remaining land title issues has taken years longer than originally expected.

See also
 Electricity sector in New Zealand

References

Government-owned companies of New Zealand
Electric power companies of New Zealand